is an American-born Japanese footballer who plays as a forward for Linköpings FC and the Japan women's national football team.

Club career
Momiki joined Nippon TV Beleza from youth team in 2011. She was selected Best Eleven in 2016 and 2017.

On 22 May 2020, Momiki signed for OL Reign of the National Women's Soccer League. After two separate loan spells in Sweden, Momiki transferred permanently to Linköpings FC on 10 December 2021.

National team career
Born in the United States to Japanese parents, Momiki was eligible to represent Japan or the United States at the international level. She opted to play for Japan.

In 2012, Momiki was selected Japan U-17 national team for 2012 U-17 World Cup.

In 2016, Momiki was selected Japan U-20 national team for 2016 U-20 World Cup. At this competition, she played 6 games and scored 7 goals, and Japan won 3rd place.

In 2017, Momiki was selected Japan national team for 2017 Algarve Cup. At this competition, on 1 March, she debuted against Spain. She played 21 games and scored 6 goals for Japan in 2017.

National team statistics

International goals
''Scores and results list Japan's goal tally first.

References

External links
 

Japan Football Association

1996 births
Living people
People from New York City
Keio University alumni
Japanese women's footballers
Japan women's international footballers
Nadeshiko League players
Nippon TV Tokyo Verdy Beleza players
Women's association football forwards
Footballers at the 2018 Asian Games
Asian Games gold medalists for Japan
Asian Games medalists in football
Medalists at the 2018 Asian Games
2019 FIFA Women's World Cup players
OL Reign players
National Women's Soccer League players
Footballers at the 2020 Summer Olympics
Olympic footballers of Japan